Oliver Martinov (born 3 May 1975 in Zadar) is a retired Croatian rower.

References 
 
 
 Oliver Martinov 

1975 births
Living people
Croatian male rowers
Sportspeople from Zadar
Rowers at the 2000 Summer Olympics
Olympic rowers of Croatia

World Rowing Championships medalists for Croatia